Neil Citron is a Canadian, Toronto-born guitarist, Grammy Award-winning recording engineer, and songwriter who played with the California-based rock bands Hero and Lana Lane as well as briefly with heavy metal band Quiet Riot in 2006, among numerous other music industry credits. He has also worked on the films My Big Fat Greek Wedding, That Thing You Do!, and Ricki and the Flash.

Early musical career
In his younger years, after playing other instruments for some time, Citron switched to playing guitar on the advice of his older cousin Howard Leese, who played with Heart. By the age of 17, Citron was a formative member of the band Hero, who were eventually signed to 20th Century Records, releasing two albums, Hero and Boys Will Be Boys. Eventually, the band would evolve into Head Shaker, fronted by David Donato, whose later credits would include Black Sabbath and the Geezer Butler Band.

With Lana Lane, Grammy Award, and Quiet Riot
By 1995, Citron had joined the band of symphonic and progressive rock singer Lana Lane and played on many of her albums, including her 1995 debut Love Is an Illusion and Curious Goods, released the following year, which both enjoyed success in Japan. Touring would follow, resulting in the release of live material and several follow-up albums and the DVD Storybook: Tales from Europe and Japan, in which Citron is featured in both live performances and interviews.

By 2002, he became more involved in solo projects as well as extensive studio work with artists such as Steve Vai, Steve Lukather, and Larry Carlton. That year, he received a Grammy Award in the Best Pop Instrumental Album category for engineering No Substitutions: Live in Osaka by Larry Carlton and Steve Lukather. His contribution to Lana Lane's albums would largely be guest spots in the studio from that point on.

In 2006, he joined Quiet Riot and played guitar on, recorded, mixed, and mastered the album Rehab, but later left and was replaced by Alex Grossi. A musical relationship with Quiet Riot drummer Frankie Banali continued and together they collaborated on two blues rock albums, I've Got the Blues (And It's All Your Fault) and the Vanilla Fudge-inspired cover album Peanut Butter Fudge.

Solo career

Citron first recorded and released Guitar Dreams in 1998, an album which had liner notes penned by Steve Vai and was released initially on Think Tank Media. It was later re-released with bonus material as In Search of Higher Ground. Other solo projects would include Absolute (2001) and Flavored Jam (2006), which featured a rhythm section powered by Matt and Gregg Bissonette.

BangTower

In 2010, Citron formed the progressive rock group BangTower with virtuoso Welsh bassist Percy Jones and Los Angeles drummer Walter Garces, and the trio released the album Casting Shadows in September of that year.

In December 2016, BangTower released their sophomore album, With N With Out, which together with Citron, Jones, and Garces, featured guest performances by Frankie Banali (Quiet Riot), Rodger Carter (John 5, Rick Springfield, Lita Ford), Robbie Pagliari (Ohm), Jon Pomplin, Joan Fraley, Justin Stone, Chris Colovus, and Josh Greenbaum. The album was engineered, mixed, and mastered by Citron and much of the material was written by him, including two songs, "Kitty's Real Groove" and "My Father's Eyes", dedicated to his parents.

In August 2017, he released a seven-track digital-only BangTower EP titled Hey, Where'd Everybody Go?, again teaming up with Robbie Pagliari on bass and Frankie Banali on acoustic percussion. This EP was mixed and mastered specifically for digital distribution by Citron.

September 2019 saw BangTower release The Road We Travel, which, in addition to Citron and Pagliari, featured drummer Rudd Weatherwax with horns credited to Maynard G. Krebs.

Black Cat 6

In late 2019, Citron got together with drummer Luke Fattore as well as bassist and Declassified Records owner Jon Pomplin (Sea of Monsters) to form the rock band Black Cat 6. Their album Scratching My Itch was released in December 2019.

Movie work
Citron has contributed music to a number of films throughout his career. He worked on the 1996 Tom Hanks movie That Thing You Do! as a musical instructor to the actors as well as performing guitar parts on the original band songs for the soundtrack. He also worked on the 2002 hit My Big Fat Greek Wedding as editor for the film and sound engineer on the commentary for the DVD release. In 2015, he worked on the Meryl Streep movie Ricki and the Flash as Streep's guitar mentor, as well as doing work on song composition, recording, and other sound duties.

While being credited with extensive work as a sound engineer and producer, notable is his custom-designed virtual guitar amplifier featured as part of Waves GTR3 from Waves Audio.

Personal interests
Citron has been training in martial arts for over 35 years. He holds a third-degree black belt in American Tang Soo Do style of Karate under former Chuck Norris black belt Dennis Ichikawa. He also holds sixth-degree black belts in several Korean styles - Taekwondo, Hapkido, and Sib Pal Gi.

Discography

Solo
 Guitar Dreams (1998)
 Absolute (2001)
 Flavored Jam (2006)

Hero
 Hero (1977)
 Boys Will Be Boys (1978)

Lana Lane
 Love is an Illusion (1995)
 Curious Goods (1997)
 Garden of the Moon (1998)
 Echoes from the Garden (1998)
 Live in Japan (1998)
 Ballad Collection (1998)
 Queen of the Ocean (1999)
 Echoes from the Ocean (1999)
 Ballad Collection (2002)
 Project Shangri-La (2002)
 Covers Collection  (2002)
 Storybook: Tales from Europe and Japan (DVD 2004)
 Return to Japan (2004)
 Lady Macbeth (2005)
 El Dorado Hotel (2012)

Erik Norlander
 Music Machine (2003)

Quiet Riot
 Rehab (2006)

BangTower
 Casting Shadows (2010)
 With N With Out (2016)
 Hey, Where'd Everybody Go? (2017)
 The Road We Travel (2019)

Citron-Banali (with Frankie Banali)
 I've Got the Blues and (It's All Your Fault) (2012)
 Peanut Butter Fudge (2012)

Black Cat 6
 Scratching My Itch (2019)

References

External links
 
 
 BangTower official website

Quiet Riot members
Grammy Award winners
Living people
Year of birth missing (living people)
Place of birth missing (living people)